Snyder is an unincorporated town, a post office, and a census-designated place (CDP) located in and governed by Morgan County, Colorado, United States. The CDP is a part of the Fort Morgan, CO Micropolitan Statistical Area. The Snyder post office has the ZIP Code 80750. As of the 2020 census, the population of the Snyder CDP was 136.

History
The town is named after J.W. Snyder (1837-1922), a pioneer rancher.

Geography
Snyder is in eastern Morgan County, on the north side of the valley of the South Platte River. Colorado State Highway 71 passes through the community, leading south  to Brush and north  to Kimball, Nebraska.

Demographics

See also

Outline of Colorado
Index of Colorado-related articles
State of Colorado
Colorado cities and towns
Colorado census designated places
Colorado counties
Morgan County, Colorado
Colorado metropolitan areas
Fort Morgan Micropolitan Statistical Area

References

External links

Snyder @ UncoverColorado.com
Morgan County website

Census-designated places in Morgan County, Colorado
Census-designated places in Colorado